The 2012–13 ACB season was the 30th season of the Spanish basketball league Liga ACB, also called Liga Endesa in its sponsored identity.

The regular season started on September 29, 2012 and ended on May 19, 2013. Playoffs started on May 23 and ended on June 19. FC Barcelona Regal were the defending champions, and Real Madrid took the 2013 title.

Teams and venues
Relegated to LEB Oro
Asefa Estudiantes (17th)
Blancos de Rueda Valladolid (18th)
Promoted from LEB Oro
Iberostar Canarias (Champion)
Menorca Bàsquet (2nd)

Asefa Estudiantes and Blancos de Rueda Valladolid remained in Liga ACB after Iberostar Canarias and Menorca Bàsquet resigned to promote.

On 20 July 2012, CB Lucentum Alicante sold its berth to the ACB and this was for CB 1939 Canarias, who finally promoted.

Managerial changes

Before the start of the season

During the season

Regular season

League table

Positions by round

Results

Playoffs

Statistical leaders

Index

Points

Rebounds

Assists

Awards

Regular season MVP
 Nikola Mirotić – Real Madrid

All-ACB team

ACB Rising Star Award
Salah Mejri – Blusens Monbús

Best Coach
Pablo Laso - Real Madrid

Player of the Week

Player of the month 
{| class="wikitable sortable" style="text-align: center"
! align="center"|Month
! align="center"|Week
! align="center"|Player
! align="center"|Team
! align="center"|PIR
! align="center"|Source
|-
|October||1–5||align="left"| Nikola Mirotić||align="left"|Real Madrid||21.4|| 
|-
|November||6–9||align="left"| Othello Hunter||align="left"|Blancos de Rueda Valladolid||21.0|| 
|-
|December||10–15||align="left"| Germán Gabriel||align="left"|Asefa Estudiantes||21.1|| 
|-
|January||16–19||align="left"| Carl English||align="left"|Asefa Estudiantes||22.0|| 
|-
|February||20–22||align="left"| Ante Tomić||align="left"|FC Barcelona Regal||26.3|| 
|-
|March||23–27||align="left"| Nacho Martín||align="left"|Blancos de Rueda Valladolid||21.8|| 
|-
|April||28–31||align="left"| Albert Oliver||align="left"|FIATC Joventut||25.8|| 
|-
|May||32–34||align="left"| Justin Doellman||align="left"|Valencia Basket||23.0||

Attendances in regular season

|-
|align="center"|1 ||align="left"|Laboral Kutxa
| 165,749 || 14,381 || 7,143 || 9,750 || %
|-
|align="center"|2 ||align="left"|Uxúe Bilbao Basket
| 163,645 || 10,014 || 7,830 || 9,626 || %
|-
|align="center"|3 ||align="left"|Asefa Estudiantes
| 153,392 || 12,123 || 7,231 || 9,023 || %
|-
|align="center"|4 ||align="left"|Valencia BC
| 133,700 || 9,000 || 6,800 || 7,865 || %
|-
|align="center"|5 ||align="left"|CAI Zaragoza
| 129,650 || 9,600 || 6,050 || 7,626 || %
|-
|align="center"|5 ||align="left"|Real Madrid
| 129,318 || 12,238 || 5,427 || 7,607 || %
|-
|align="center"|7 ||align="left"|Lagun Aro GBC
| 108,160 || 8,180 || 4,720 || 6,362 || %
|-
|align="center"|8 ||align="left"|Unicaja
| 105,274 || 9,000 || 3,500 || 6,193 || %
|-
|align="center"|9 ||align="left"|UCAM Murcia
| 96,262 || 7,068 || 5,012 || 5,662 || %
|-
|align="center"|10||align="left"|Blu:sens Monbús
| 92,030 || 5,890 || 5,112 || 5,414 || %
|-
|align="center"|11||align="left"|FIATC Joventut
| 88,913 || 8,275 || 3,818 || 5,230 || %
|-
|align="center"|12||align="left"|Mad-Croc Fuenlabrada
| 86,358 || 5,700 || 4,339 || 5,080 || %
|-
|align="center"|13||align="left"|Blancos de Rueda Valladolid
| 83,200 || 6,200 || 4,000 || 4,894 || %
|-
|align="center"|14||align="left"|Herbalife Gran Canaria
| 79,329 || 5,133 || 3,821 || 4,666 || %
|-
|align="center"|15||align="left"|FC Barcelona Regal
| 77,538 || 7,359 || 2,398 || 4,561 || %
|-
|align="center"|16||align="left"|La Bruixa d'Or
| 72,700 || 5,000 || 3,550 || 4,276 || %
|-
|align="center"|17||align="left"|CB Canarias
| 70,666 || 4,987 || 3,413 || 4,157 || %1
|-
|align="center"|18||align="left"|Cajasol
| 67,750 || 6,800 || 2,300 || 3,985 || %
|-

Highest attendance:
 14,381 at Fernando Buesa Arena (Round 12, Laboral Kutxa 81–80 Uxúe Bilbao Basket)
Lowest attendance:
 2,300 at San Pablo (Round 34, Cajasol 68–76 Mad-Croc Fuenlabrada)

References

Notes

External links
 ACB.com 
 linguasport.com 

 
Liga ACB seasons

 
Spain